Flight 471 may refer to the following accidents and incidents involving commercial airliners:
Japan Airlines Flight 471, which crashed near Delhi Airport on 14 June 1972, resulting in 85 fatalities.
UTair Flight 471, which crash-landed on 17 March 2007 at Kurumoch International Airport, resulting in six fatalities.
Air Gabon Flight 471, which overran the runway at Libreville International Airport on 19 December 2003, with no fatalities.
0471